HD 188015 b is an extrasolar planet announced by the California and Carnegie Planet Search team in 2005. Like majority of known planets, it was discovered using the radial velocity method.

The planet has a minimum mass of about 1.25 Jupiter masses. It orbits HD 188015 in a slightly eccentric orbit with a semi-major axis about 20% further than Earth's.

Stability analysis reveals that if Earth-sized planets existed at the Trojan points of HD 188015 b, their orbits would be stable for long periods of time.

References

Bibliography

External links
 
 

Exoplanets discovered in 2006
Giant planets
Giant planets in the habitable zone
Vulpecula
Exoplanets detected by radial velocity

es:HD 188015#Sistema planetario
ru:HD 188015#Планета